Peter Rowan is the first solo album by the country rock / bluegrass musician Peter Rowan. Guest musicians are Peter's brother Lorin Rowan (piano), Flaco Jimenez (accordion), and Richard Greene (fiddle).

Track listing
All tracks composed by Peter Rowan; except where indicated
"Outlaw Love" - 3:21
"Break My Heart Again" - 5:14
"A Woman in Love"  - 2:21
"When I Was a Cowboy"  (Lead Belly) - 2:38
"Land of the Navajo" - 6:19
"The Free Mexican Airforce" - 6:01
"Panama Red" - 3:01
"Midnight-Moonlight" - 4:13
"The Gypsy King's Farewell"  - 4:15

Personnel
Peter Rowan - guitar, mandolin, mandola, vocals
Lorin Rowan - guitar, piano, vocals
Roger Mason - bass, fiddle, vocals
Richard Greene - fiddle, violin
Jimmy Fuller - steel guitar
Flaco Jiménez - accordion
Lamar Greer - banjo
Paul Lenart - guitar, slide guitar
Tex Logan - fiddle, violin
Barry Mitterhoff - mandolin
Buell Neidlinger - bass fiddle, fiddle
Todd Phillips - bass fiddle, fiddle
Jesse Ponce - banjo, bajo sexto, bass
Mike Seeger - autoharp
Estrella Berosini - vocals
Alice Gerrard - vocals
Laura Eastman - vocals

Production
Producer: Peter Rowan
Recording Engineer: Sam Baroda/Gregg Lunsford/Jon Monday/John Nagy/Bob Shumaker
Mixing: Gragg Lunsford 
Remix: the Mixing Lab August 17,18,19, 1978, Newton Mass.  Gragg Lunsford, John Nagy; engineers
Photography/Artwork: Hand painted photos: Lizzara Lennard
Design: Thomas Ingalls

Peter Rowan albums
1978 albums